Thomas Edward Pannone (born April 28, 1994) is an American professional baseball pitcher in the Milwaukee Brewers organization. He has played in Major League Baseball (MLB) for the Toronto Blue Jays.

High school and college
Pannone attended Bishop Hendricken High School in Warwick, Rhode Island, where he was an outfielder as well as a pitcher. He was drafted by the Chicago Cubs in the 33rd round of the 2012 Major League Baseball draft, but did not sign and attended the College of Southern Nevada. Pannone stopped playing outfield in college, focusing solely on pitching. In his lone season of college baseball, he posted a 6–2 win–loss record, 1.84 earned run average (ERA), and 78 strikeouts in 53 innings pitched.

Professional career

Cleveland Indians
Pannone was selected by the Cleveland Indians in the ninth round of the 2013 Major League Baseball draft. He made his professional debut with the Rookie-level Arizona League Indians. He made 14 relief appearances in 2013 and pitched to a 1–0 record, 9.00 ERA, and 20 strikeouts in 16 innings. He remained in the Arizona League for the 2014 season, going 5–0 with a 3.20 ERA and 62 strikeouts in 45 innings, and was named a post-season All-Star by the league. Pannone made his full-season debut in 2015, pitching the entire season with the Class-A Lake County Captains. In 116 total innings over 27 appearances, he posted a 7–6 record, 4.02 ERA, and 120 strikeouts. Pannone began the 2016 season with Lake County, where he was named a mid-season All-Star, before being promoted to the Advanced-A Lynchburg Hillcats in July. In total, he made 25 appearances in the 2016 season and went 8–5 with a 2.57 ERA and 122 strikeouts in 133 innings.

Pannone was assigned to Advanced-A Lynchburg to open the 2017 season. In early May he was promoted to the Double-A Akron RubberDucks, and was named an Eastern League All-Star at mid-season.

Toronto Blue Jays
On July 31, 2017, Pannone was traded, along with Samad Taylor, to the Toronto Blue Jays for Joe Smith. He was assigned to the Double-A New Hampshire Fisher Cats, and remained there for the rest of the 2017 season. On the year, Pannone posted a 9–3 record, 2.36 ERA, and 149 strikeouts in 144 innings. On November 20, 2017, Pannone was added to Toronto's 40-man roster.

On March 16, 2018, Pannone was suspended for 80 games after testing positive for dehydrochlormethyltestosterone, a banned performance-enhancing substance. After returning from suspension, he was assigned to the Triple-A Buffalo Bisons. On August 9, Pannone was called up by the Blue Jays. He made his first MLB start on August 22, and took a no-hitter into the seventh inning against the Baltimore Orioles. Pannone recorded the win, allowing just one hit and two walks with three strikeouts in seven innings. Pannone totaled 12 appearances for the Blue Jays, 6 of them starts, recording a record of 4-1 in 43 innings.

Pannone opened the 2019 season with the Blue Jays as a member of the bullpen. On April 14, Pannone pitched an immaculate inning against the Tampa Bay Rays, striking out Avisail Garcia, Brandon Lowe, and Daniel Robertson on 9 consecutive strikes. It is the third immaculate inning in Blue Jays team history; Steve Delabar and Roger Clemens are the other two who have managed the feat.

On August 24, 2020, Pannone was designated for assignment without making an appearance on the season. He became a free agent on November 2, 2020.

Los Angeles Angels
On November 24, 2020, Pannone signed a minor league contract with the Los Angeles Angels organization. Pannone spent the 2021 season with the Triple-A Salt Lake Bees, but struggled to a 5-11 record and 7.07 ERA in 24 games (21 of them starts). He elected free agency following the season on November 7, 2021.

Boston Red Sox
On March 11, 2022, Pannone signed a minor league contract with the Boston Red Sox. On June 27, he was released.

Kia Tigers
On June 28, 2022, Pannone signed with the Kia Tigers of the Korea Baseball Organization.

Milwaukee Brewers
On December 16, 2022, Pannone signed a minor league deal with the Milwaukee Brewers.

References

External links

1994 births
Akron RubberDucks players
American expatriate baseball players in Canada
Arizona League Indians players
Baseball players from Rhode Island
Buffalo Bisons (minor league) players
Dunedin Blue Jays players
Lake County Captains players
Living people
Lynchburg Hillcats players
Major League Baseball pitchers
New Hampshire Fisher Cats players
Salt Lake Bees players
Southern Nevada Coyotes baseball players
Toronto Blue Jays players
Bishop Hendricken High School alumni